Falling You is an American ambient/electronic project based in San Francisco, California, United States. Falling You's instrumental work tends toward dark ambient soundscapes which borders on electronica. Other tracks utilize ethereal female vocals. John Michael Zorko is the primary composer for Falling You. Notable vocalists include Dru Allen (This Ascension/Mirabilis), Aimee Page, Jennifer McPeak, Sara Ayers, Krista Tortora (Full Blown Kirk), Victoria Lloyd (Claire Voyant), Suzanne Perry (Love Spirals Downwards), Amanda Kramer (Golden Palominos), Shikhee (Android Lust) and Erica Mulkey (Unwoman). The band's debut CD, Mercy, in 1998 featured vocals by Jennifer McPeak exclusively. Touch, Human, Faith, Adore, Blush, and the most recent release, Shine, feature vocals by a variety of female artists. As a general rule the lyrics to the songs are written by the vocalist, working in collaboration with Zorko to make a fit for his composition.

The work of Falling You tends to center, thematically, on some core part of the human condition.

Zorko's music has also been featured in documentaries and television commercials.

Touring is difficult for the band because of the logistics of so many vocalists being committed to other projects, but they have successfully performed as far away as Japan.

Discography

Albums
 Mercy (CD) - 1998
 Touch (CD) - 2005
 Human (CD) - 2006
 Faith (CD) - 2008
 Adore (CD/Download) - 2011
 Blush (CD/Download) - 2013
 Shine (CD/Download) - 2017

See also 
List of ambient music artists

External links
  Falling You homepage
  Falling You on Bandcamp
 Falling You on Myspace

Magnatune artists